Čierna nad Tisou railway station is an important border railway station in the town of Čierna nad Tisou, Košice Region, Slovakia. It is close to the border with Ukraine and, as the railways have two different gauges, all trains have to change gauge here: the railway has 916 tracks and is the biggest 'harbour on land' in Central Europe. The first station across the border is Chop. The station is on the Pan-European Corridor VA from Venice in Italy to Kyiv in Ukraine via Bratislava, Žilina, Košice and Uzhhorod.

Train services
The station is served by the following trains:

Osobný vlak (local stopping service) Košice - Čierna nad Tisou
RegionalExpress Košice - Čierna nad Tisou
Osobný vlak (local stopping service) Čierna nad Tisou - Chop

See also
 Uzhhorod–Košice broad-gauge track, a Russian-gauge line from Ukraine into Slovakia

References

External links
Slovak Railways website
Article on converting the line to Broad Gauge

Railway stations in Košice Region
Railway stations in Slovakia opened in the 19th century
Railway stations  opened in 1872